Linda is the debut studio album recorded by American singer Linda Clifford, released in 1977 on the Curtom Records label.

History
The album features the single "From Now On", which peaked at No. 94 on the Billboard Hot Soul Singles chart. The song also reached No. 28 on Hot Dance Club Play chart along with the song "You Can Do It".

Track listing

Charts
Singles

References

External links 
 

1977 debut albums
Linda Clifford albums
Albums produced by Gil Askey
Curtom Records albums